Auratonota exoptata is a species of moth of the family Tortricidae. It is found in Brazil.

The wingspan is about 15 mm. The ground colour of the forewings is strongly suffused brown with darker markings, edged silver mainly in the distal half where black strigulae are present. The hindwings are grey-brown, but paler in the basal third.

References

Moths described in 2000
Auratonota
Moths of South America